D98  may refer to:
 HMS Emperor (D98)
 HMS York (D98)
 HMS Effingham (D98)
 Greek destroyer Psara (D98)